The Libra Tour was the second concert tour by American pop-R&B singer Toni Braxton. The tour, which was in support of her RIAA gold-selling album Libra, kicked off in Atlantic City, New Jersey, on March 10 and continued through mid-summer. Braxton played to sold-out shows across the US, performing in venues such as theaters, instead of arenas. 

The tour included a selection of songs from the new album, and featured hit songs from Toni Braxton, Secrets, The Heat and More Than a Woman. Toni's sisters, Tamar Braxton and Trina Braxton, joined the tour as background singers.

Opening act
James Stephens III (select dates)

Set list
"Overture" (Instrumental)
"Please"
"Spanish Guitar" 
"He Wasn't Man Enough"
"Take This Ring"
"How Many Ways"
"You're Makin' Me High"
"Suddenly"1
"Shadowless"
"Just Be a Man About It"
"I Don't Want To"
"Love Shoulda Brought You Home"
"Seven Whole Days"
"Another Sad Love Song"
"You Mean the World to Me"
"How Could an Angel Break My Heart"
"Let It Flow"
"Trippin' (That's the Way Love Works)"
"I Wanna Be (Your Baby)"
Encore
"Breathe Again"
"Un-Break My Heart"

1 performed only at selected dates

Additional notes
 On select dates, as Toni performed one of her signature ballads; she would choose a lucky gentleman to bring on stage, as she sat on his lap and sang. One of the many highlights throughout the show, and a rousing ovation from the crowd.

Shows

Festivals and other miscellaneous performances
Hampton Jazz Festival
Live at the Garden Summer Concert Series
Essence Music Festival

References

Toni Braxton concert tours
2006 concert tours